In baseball statistics, slugging percentage (SLG) is a measure of the batting productivity of a hitter. It is calculated as total bases divided by at bats, through the following formula, where AB is the number of at bats for a given player, and 1B, 2B, 3B, and HR are the number of singles, doubles, triples, and home runs, respectively:

 

Unlike batting average, slugging percentage gives more weight to extra-base hits such as doubles and home runs, relative to singles. Plate appearances resulting in walks, hit-by-pitches, catcher's interference, and sacrifice bunts or flies are specifically excluded from this calculation, as such an appearance is not counted as an at bat (these are not factored into batting average either).

The name is a misnomer, as the statistic is not a percentage but an average of how many bases a player achieves per at bat. It is a scale of measure whose computed value is a number from 0 to 4. This might not be readily apparent given that a Major League Baseball player's slugging percentage is almost always less than 1 (as a majority of at bats result in either 0 or 1 base). The statistic gives a double twice the value of a single, a triple three times the value, and a home run four times. The slugging percentage would have to be divided by 4 to actually be a percentage (of bases achieved per at bat out of total bases possible). As a result, it is occasionally called slugging average, or simply slugging, instead.

A slugging percentage is always expressed as a decimal to three decimal places, and is generally spoken as if multiplied by 1000. For example, a slugging percentage of .589 would be spoken as "five eighty nine," and one of 1.127 would be spoken as "eleven twenty seven."

Facts about slugging percentage 
A slugging percentage is not just for the use of measuring the productivity of a hitter. It can be applied as an evaluative tool for pitchers. It is not as common but it is referred to as slugging-percentage against.

In 2019, the mean average SLG among all teams in Major League Baseball was .435.

The maximum slugging percentage has a numerical value of 4.000. However, no player in the history of the MLB has ever retired with a 4.000 slugging percentage. Five players tripled in their only at bat and therefore share the Major League record, when calculated without respect to games played or plate appearances, of a career slugging percentage of 3.000. This list includes Eric Cammack (2000 Mets); Scott Munninghoff (1980 Phillies); Eduardo Rodríguez (1973 Brewers); and Charlie Lindstrom (1958 White Sox).

Example calculation 
For example, in 1920, Babe Ruth played his first season for the New York Yankees. His total number of bases (388) divided by his total at bats (458) is .847 which constitutes his slugging percentage for the season. This also set a record for Ruth which stood until 2001 when Barry Bonds achieved 411 bases in 476 at bats bringing his slugging percentage to .863, which has been unmatched since.

Significance
Long after it was first invented, slugging percentage gained new significance when baseball analysts realized that it combined with on-base percentage (OBP) to form a very good measure of a player's overall offensive production (in fact, OBP + SLG was originally referred to as "production" by baseball writer and statistician Bill James). A predecessor metric was developed by Branch Rickey in 1954. Rickey, in Life magazine, suggested that combining OBP with what he called "extra base power" (EBP) would give a better indicator of player performance than typical Triple Crown stats. EBP was a predecessor to slugging percentage.

Allen Barra and George Ignatin were early adopters in combining the two modern-day statistics, multiplying them together to form what is now known as "SLOB" (Slugging × On-Base). Bill James applied this principle to his runs created formula several years later (and perhaps independently), essentially multiplying SLOB × at bats to create the formula:

 

In 1984, Pete Palmer and John Thorn developed perhaps the most widespread means of combining slugging and on-base percentage: On-base plus slugging (OPS), which is a simple addition of the two values. Because it is easy to calculate, OPS has been used with increased frequency in recent years as a shorthand form to evaluate contributions as a batter.

In a 2015 article, Bryan Grosnick made the point that "on base" and "slugging" may not be comparable enough to be simply added together. "On base" has a theoretical maximum of 1.000 whereas "slugging" has a theoretical maximum of 4.000. The actual numbers do not show as big a difference, with Grosnick listing .350 as a good "on base" and .430 as a good "slugging."  He goes on to say that OPS has the advantages of simplicity and availability and further states, "you'll probably get it 75% right, at least."

Perfect slugging percentage
The maximum numerically possible slugging percentage is 4.000. A number of MLB players (117 through the end of the 2016 season) have momentarily had a 4.000 career slugging percentage by homering in their first major league at bat.

See also

 List of Major League Baseball career slugging percentage leaders
 Moneyball
 Sabermetrics

References

External links
 Slugging Percentage Calculator

Baseball terminology
Batting statistics
Percentages